The 1915 Far Eastern Championship Games was the second edition of the regional multi-sport event, contested between China, Japan and the Philippines, and was held from 15 to 22 May 1915 in Shanghai, Republic of China. A total of nine sports were contested – the inclusion of cycling increased the total from the eight held at the first edition. This marked the first time that the event was held under its Far Eastern Championship Games moniker, followed a change from the naming as the Oriental Olympic Games in 1913.

In the football competition, China was represented by South China AA, a Hong Kong-based team.

Participating nations

Sports

References

Far Eastern Championship Games
Far Eastern Championship Games
Far Eastern Championship Games
Far Eastern Championship Games
International sports competitions hosted by China
Multi-sport events in China
1910s in Shanghai
Sports competitions in Shanghai
May 1915 sports events